Paola Vittoria (born 11 November 1960) is an Antigua and Barbuda sailor. She competed in the Star event at the 1992 Summer Olympics.

References

External links
 

1960 births
Living people
Antigua and Barbuda female sailors (sport)
Antigua and Barbuda people of Italian descent
Olympic sailors of Antigua and Barbuda
Sailors at the 1992 Summer Olympics – Star
Sportspeople from Naples